Channels State Forest is a  state forest located in Washington and Russell counties, Virginia. The Channels Natural Area Preserve is located within the forest, which protects the Great Channels of Virginia, comprising slot canyons formed within 400-million-year-old sandstone outcroppings.

Channels State Forest is owned and maintained by the Virginia Department of Forestry. The forest is open to the public for hunting, horseback riding, and hiking; camping and motorized vehicles are prohibited. Some uses require visitors to possess a valid State Forest Use Permit.

Images

See also
 List of Virginia state forests

References

External links
Channels State Forest

Virginia state forests
Protected areas of Washington County, Virginia
Protected areas of Russell County, Virginia
2007 establishments in Virginia
Protected areas established in 2007